Another Summer (Japanese: アナザーサマー; stylized as ANOTHER SUMMER) is the fourth studio album by Kiyotaka Sugiyama & Omega Tribe, released by VAP on July 1, 1985. It was the first album release with a five-member formation after guitarist Kenji Yoshida left the band in April. The album was #1 on the Oricon chart. The album gave the band another hit single with "Futari no Natsu Monogatari" (ふたりの夏物語 - Never Ending Summer), which was #5 on the Oricon chart.

Background 
After guitarist Kenji Yoshida withdrew from the band in April, the album was the first release with a five-member formation. Lead vocalist Kiyotaka Sugiyama commented, "We cut down the brass sound from the front and cherished the original sound of the band," and the band sound was now simple and light.

The single "Futari no Natsu Monogatari" was a hit, charting at #5 on the Oricon chart.
The album was ranked 1st on Oricon and 13th on the 1985 annual album chart.
It is the only work released in the summer (June to August), excluding best-of albums and planning boards.

The cover of the jacket and lyrics card was taken on the island of Mykonos in Greece, and below the title is a description of the hotel "Les Morin" on the island.

Track listing

Personnel 

Bass – Takao Oshima 
Session Coordinator – Sound Seven 
Designers – Rikako Furuya, Takeharu Tanaka 
Directors – Ken Shiguma, Shigeru Matsuhashi 
Drums and percussion – Keiichi Hiroishi 
Overdubbing Engineers – Hiroshi Fujita, Jun Wakao, Koichi Hirase, Tatsuo Sekine 
Engineers – Junichi Fujimori, Mizuo Miura, Satoshi Yoshii, Yoshiaki Matsuoka 
Executive Producers – Atsushi Kitamura, Katsuhiko Endo 
Guitar – Shinji Takashima 
Keyboards – Toshitsugu Nishihara  
Lacquer cutting – Osamu Shimoju 
Artist Management – Triangle Production 
Photography – Jushi Watanabe 
Producer – Koichi Fujita 
Recording and Mixing – Kunihiko Shimizu 
Supervising – Tetsuji Hayashi 
Vocals – Kiyotaka Sugiyama

Charts

References 

1985 albums
Omega Tribe (Japanese band) albums